editworks was a post-production company located in The Hub, Pacific Quay, Glasgow. It specialised in long form Broadcast programmes in a variety of genres. Light entertainment, comedy, documentary, children’s, factual and sport. It also did corporate work.

Company info

History

Editworks was founded in 1990 by Paul Smith, of Complete Communications, as a broadcast offshoot from Complete Video, which targeted mostly short form commercial work. It was originally based at Chelsea Harbour along with The Shooting Crew, which provided cameras and crew for location productions. Editworks was initially run by Geraint Owen, with Graham Hutchings and Perry Widdowson as editors. The Shooting Crew was run by Barry Noakes. Mark Sangster joined the company in 1992, from Thames Television. Originally, there were two linear online edit suites and one U-matic offline suite, based at Chelsea Harbour. Any extra sound work usually went to be finished at Complete Video in Covent Garden. In 1993, editworks used Avid for the first time to cut a Paul McCartney documentary and the non-linear system soon became the editors and Producers preferred tool. Expansion continued and in 1995 it was decided to build an audio dubbing suite at Chelsea and Adrian Smith joined the company as dubbing mixer from TVS. The U-matic offline suite became a third linear online and three dedicated Avid offline suites were built. Ex-BBC editor Steve Murray joined the company on 18 September 1995. During that period, James Thomas and Paul Richmond were promoted to editors from the Technical Staff. Following the success of Who Wants to Be a Millionaire?, Paul Smith decided to divest himself of editworks and invited the management team to buy the company from him. In 2000, Jim Boyers (then General Manager), together with Roger Cumner (Chief Engineer), Graham Hutchings, Mark Sangster, Adrian Smith and Perry Widdowson formed editworks 2000 ltd. The company was relocated from Chelsea Harbour to its present location in Charlotte Street, London. In 2005, Nick Dixon was promoted to on-line DS Editor as well as continuing to supervise the technical area along with Steve Willey, and Matt Ramsay joined as Dubbing Mixer. In 2008, a formal in-house editor training scheme commenced with three technical assistants, Brendon Blackshaw, Rebecca Bowker and John Foxen taking part. In 2010, Andrew Barrett (Ex-Heinz CEO) became Editworks’ Company Chairman to assist the company’s growth into the Scottish Television market. In June 2010, Editworks Scotland opened in The Hub, Pacific Quay, Glasgow. On 12 September 2012 Editworks 2000 Ltd entered administration. Editworks Scotland Ltd continued to trade until it entered administration in August 2019.

Early Shows

 Red Dwarf
 Talking Telephone Numbers
 The Detectives
 This is Your Life
 Strike It Rich
 Audiences with Shirley Bassey, Bob Downe, Ken Dodd and Ricky Martin
 Ruby Wax Meets
 Brass Eye
 Back Date
 The Hypnotic World of Paul McKenna
 Blankety Blank
 Commercial Breakdown
 Sean's Show
 Catchphrase
 All Rise for Julian Clary
 All Talk (Clive Anderson chat show)
 Play Your Cards Right
 The Day Today
 Reeves and Mortimer
 Heroes of Comedy
 The Tweenies
 Roadhog
 Disney’s Night of Magic
 Cirque du Monde
 Fort Boyard
 The South Bank Show Special on Cliff Richard
 The Last Voyage of the Thistlegorm
 The Weakest Link
 Dog Eat Dog
 Friends Like These
 Paul Merton’s History of The London Palladium
 Man O Man
 Night Fever
 Foot in the Door
 The Vicar of Dibley
 Delia Smith’s Summer Collection
 My Hero
 Birds of a Feather
 Goodnight Sweetheart
 The Trial of Jasper Carrott
 Vic & Bob’s Families at War
 The Jeremy Clarkson Chat Show
 Grudge Match
 The Laureus World Sports Awards
 Toyota Corporate Videos
 Hipnosis
 The Royal Variety Performance
 The Frank Skinner Show
 So Graham Norton

Recent Work

 The Graham Norton Show
 Harry Hill's TV Burp
 Al Murray's Happy Hour
 Baddiel and Skinner Unplanned
 The Frank Skinner Show
 Russell Howard's Good News
 Take Me Out
 Who Wants to Be a Millionaire?
 In It to Win It
 Who Dares Wins
 Eggheads
 The King is Dead
 National Television Awards
 The National Movie Awards
 The Colour of Money
 Dancing on Ice: The Tour
 Cliff Richard and The Shadows
 Jamie Saves Our Bacon
 American Idol Inserts
 You Are What You Eat
 Jack Dee in Siberia
 America Unchained
 Duel
 The Price is Right
 All Star Family Fortunes
 Kids Behind Bars

Recent Clients

 10 Star Entertainment
 12 Yard
 2Entertain
 2waytraffic
 Alan King Productions
 Avalon TV Ltd
 Baby Cow Productions
 Baker Coogan Productions
 Banana Split Productions
 BBC
 BBC Scotland
 Big Bear Films
 Big Kahuna Productions
 British Forces Foundation
 Cactus TV
 Channel 4
 Channel 5
 Cineflix Productions
 CPL
 Darlow Smithson
 David Paradine Productions
 Diverse Media
 Endemol UK
 Eyeworks
 Fox Television
 Fox World UK
 Fremantle Media
 Fresh One Productions
 Gallowgate TV
 Granada Television
 Green Bay Media Ltd
 Hamma & Glamma Productions
 Hat Trick Productions
 Hotsauce TV
 Indigo Television
 ITN Factual
 ITV Sport
 ITV Studios
 Knight Ayton Management
 Kudos Film and Television
 Latitude Productions
 Lemon Mouse Ltd
 Magnum TV
 Mandate
 Medialink
 MEM Television
 Mentorn
 MTV Networks
 Objective Productions
 Octagon CSI
 On the Box Television
 One Arm Bandit Ltd Trading
 Open Mike Productions
 Optomen Television
 Paradine Productions
 Phil McIntytre Productions
 Pozzitive Television
 Pretzel Films
 Prime Suspects
 Princess Productions
 Rainmark Films
 Red Havok Media
 Rex Entertainment
 Ricochet Ltd
 Rockhopper TV
 Ruggie Media
 Shepperton Studios
 Shine Ltd
 Silver River Productions
 So Television
 Solutions TV
 Sony Pictures
 Spun Gold
 Talent Television Ltd
 talkbackTHAMES
 Target Entertainment
 The Prince's Trust
 The Walt Disney Company
 Tiger Aspect Productions
 TWI London
 Two Four Broadcast
 Universal Pictures
 Virgin Media
 Visual Voodoo
 Vixpix
 Warner Music
 Wised Up Ltd
 Zenith Entertainment
 Zip Television
 Zodiak Entertainment
 Zone Content

References

External links
 Editworks Official Website
 

Mass media companies of the United Kingdom
Television and film post-production companies